SJ Smith Stadium is a multi-use stadium at the Lamontville district, in the Chatsworth suburb of Durban, situated in the KwaZulu-Natal province of South Africa. It is currently used mostly for football matches, and was the home venue of Durban Stars and African Wanderers during the 2010-11 season of Vodacom League.

Recently implemented upgrades
The stadium received a major upgrade in 2008, in order for it to comply with FIFA standards for "training venues", ahead of the 2010 FIFA World Cup. Upgrading the stadium costed 18.8 million Rand, and provided the following improvements:
 New improved walling and fencing around the stadium.
 Installation of a PA system.
 New grandstand, including medical facilities, VOC, JOC and VIP area.
 Demolished area around the stadium to create additional seating area, on the northern and southern side of the stadium.
 "Dug outs" for reserve players.
 Improved floodlighting.
 A formal pitch irrigation and drainage system.

References

Sports venues in Durban
Soccer venues in South Africa